Trogossitinae is a subfamily of beetles in the family Trogossitidae.

References 

 Kolibáč, J. 2014: Trogossitidae: A review of the beetle family, with a catalogue and keys. ZooKeys, 366: 1–194, 

Trogossitidae
Beetle subfamilies